Peter Odhiambo (born 14 October 1927) was a Kenyan-born Ugandan boxer. He competed in the men's middleweight event at the 1960 Summer Olympics and the men's 75 kg event at the 1962 British Empire and Commonwealth Games. At the 1960 Summer Olympics, he lost to Eddie Crook Jr. of the United States.

References

External links
 
 
 

1927 births
Possibly living people
Ugandan male boxers
Olympic boxers of Uganda
Boxers at the 1960 Summer Olympics
People from Kisumu County
Middleweight boxers
Boxers at the 1962 British Empire and Commonwealth Games
Commonwealth Games competitors for Uganda